New Hope Baptist Church is a historic church located 4 miles west of Beatrice, Alabama in the unincorporated community of Natchez.  The Greek Revival building was built in 1870.  It was added to the Alabama Register of Landmarks and Heritage on February 4, 2000, and the National Register of Historic Places on July 7, 2005.

References

Baptist churches in Alabama
Churches on the National Register of Historic Places in Alabama
Greek Revival church buildings in Alabama
Churches completed in 1870
Churches in Monroe County, Alabama
Properties on the Alabama Register of Landmarks and Heritage
National Register of Historic Places in Monroe County, Alabama
1870 establishments in Alabama